The 1968 Copa Perú season, the promotion tournament of Peruvian football.

In this tournament after many qualification rounds, each one of the 24 departments in which Peru is politically divided, qualified a team. Those teams plus the team relegated from First Division on the last year, enter in two more rounds and finally 6 of them qualify for the Final round, staged in Lima (the capital).

The winning team, Carlos A. Mannucci, was promoted to play in 1968 Torneo Descentralizado.

Finalists teams
The following list shows the teams that qualified for the Regional Stage.

Regional stage

Región Norte A

Región Norte B

Region Oriente

Region Centro

Region Sur

Final stage

Final group stage

Round 1

Round 2

Round 3

Round 4

Round 5

External links
  Copa Peru 1968
  Semanario Pasión

Copa Perú seasons
Cop